MTP may refer to:

Economy, politics and society 
  (Movement for Tolerance and Progress), a political party in Burkina Faso
  (Poznań International Fair), a trade fair in Poland
 Marseille Trop Puissant, an Olympique de Marseille supporters group
 Meet the Press, an American television program
 Macy's Thanksgiving Day Parade
 Mid Term Plan(ning), a firm's business plan for the next 2 or 3 years, usually based on quantitative risk management
 Movimiento Todos por la Patria, an Argentine guerrilla movement active from 1974 to 1976
 Motion to Proceed, a procedural tool sometimes used in the United States Senate during the development of legislation
 Sơn Tùng M-TP, a Vietnamese singer

Geography 
 Mount Pleasant (Amtrak station), Iowa, United States, Amtrak station code
 Mount Pleasant, South Carolina, United States
 Montpellier, France

Science and medicine 
 Massive transfusion protocol, a form of blood transfusion
 Medial tibial plateau, at the upper end of the tibia
 Medical termination of pregnancy, the termination of a pregnancy by the removal or expulsion of an embryo or fetus from the uterus
 Metatarsophalangeal joint, the joint between the foot and the toe
 Methadone treatment program, a form of treatment for heroin addiction
 Microsomal triglyceride transfer protein, a liver protein linked to LDL release
 Mitochondrial permeability transition pore
 Mitochondrial trifunctional protein, a protein which catalyzes several reactions in beta oxidation
 Microtiter plates or Microtitre plates, as defined by the SBS standard, used in biopharmaceutical applications

Technology 
 Meteosat Transition Program, the EUMETSAT programme responsible for the Meteosat system of geostationary meteorological satellites
 Missile Test Project, a US Air Force program for tracking missiles on the Eastern Test Range
 Mail Transfer Protocol, an obsolete network protocol that has been replaced by SMTP
 Media Transfer Protocol, a Microsoft protocol for transferring images, music, etc. between a computer and a portable device
 Message Transfer Part, part of Signaling System 7 (SS7) used for communication in the public switched telephone network (PSTN)
 Micro Transport Protocol (µTP), a UDP-based reliable and ordered BitTorrent peer-to-peer file sharing protocol designed to mitigate poor latency and other congestion control issues vs. TCP-based BitTorrent
 "Multi-fiber Termination Push-on", a type of fiber cable terminator optical fiber connector
 Multipurpose Transaction Protocol, a proprietary data transport protocol produced by Data Expedition, Inc.
 Multi-Terrain Pattern, military camouflage developed for the British military
 Methanol To Propylene, which is a technology for production of Propylene using Methanol as feedstock.
Move To Production, installation of a new or modified program for general use
Multi-time programmable, a type of non-volatile memory (NVM), as opposed to one-time programmable (OTP) and few-time programmable (FTP)

Gaming 
 Miles "Tails" Prower, character in the Sonic the Hedgehog series
 Magic Tea Party, a derogatory term which tabletop RPG power gamers apply to freeform roleplaying.